2 Corinthians 10 is the tenth chapter of the Second Epistle to the Corinthians in the New Testament of the Christian Bible. It is authored by Paul the Apostle and Timothy (2 Corinthians 1:1) in Macedonia in 55–56 CE. According to theologian Heinrich August Wilhelm Meyer, chapters 10–13 "contain the third chief section of the Epistle, the apostle's polemic vindication of his apostolic dignity and efficiency, and then the conclusion".

Text
The original text was written in Koine Greek. This chapter is divided into 18 verses.

Textual witnesses
Some early manuscripts containing the text of this chapter are:
Papyrus 46 (~AD 200)
Codex Vaticanus (325–350)
Codex Sinaiticus (330–360)
Codex Alexandrinus (400–440)
Codex Ephraemi Rescriptus (~450; extant verses 1–7)
Codex Freerianus (~450; extant verses 1,8–10,17–18)
Codex Claromontanus (~550)

Old Testament references
2 Corinthians 10:17:

New Testament references
2 Corinthians 10:17:

Verse 4
The weapons we fight with are not the weapons of the world (New International Version).
The weapons which Paul refers to are "not carnal",. He does not rely on human power and authority or on learning or eloquence.

Verse 10
Paul knows that he is criticised for being bold and direct in his writings but treated as weak and unassertive when he is present: he has made the same point in verse 1,
I who am humble when face to face with you, but bold toward you when I am away.

Verse 17 
 But "he who glories, let him glory in the Lord."
Believers should not glories in oneself, nor in outward circumstances of life, or inward endowments of mind, but in the Lord Jesus Christ, as the author and donor of all gifts, natural and spiritual.

See also
Macedonia
Titus
Related Bible parts: Psalm 34, Psalm 44, Jeremiah 9, 1 Corinthians 1, 2 Corinthians 11

References

Sources

External links
 King James Bible - Wikisource
English Translation with Parallel Latin Vulgate
Online Bible at GospelHall.org (ESV, KJV, Darby, American Standard Version, Bible in Basic English)
Multiple bible versions at Bible Gateway (NKJV, NIV, NRSV etc.)

2 Corinthians 10